Maayoos (English: depressed) is a 2019 Maldivian romantic web series written and directed by Ajunaz Ali. The series stars Niuma Mohamed, Ismail Rasheed and Mohamed Jumayyil in lead roles. The series narrates the consequences when a married woman finds her contentment in a younger companion, who is blood-related to her husband.

Cast 
 Niuma Mohamed as Asma
 Ismail Rasheed as Ibrahim Shakir
 Mohamed Jumayyil as Amir
 Ajunaz Ali as Zahid
 Mohamed Waheed as Adam
 Mariyam Haleem as Hareera
 Mariyam Majudha
 Azuma Abdul Rahman
 Hayyaan Hameed
 Abdul Hameed Usman
 Mohamed Faisal
 Ahmed Nizam
 Abdulah Fayaz
 Hassan Rasheed
 Hassan Hameed
 Ahmed Adam
 Ali Shazleem as Shakir's physician

Episodes

Development and release
Following the critical success of Ingili (2013), screen-writer Mahdi Ahmed announced the project in 2013 and was scheduled for a 2014 theatrical release. However, the film made on a budget of MVR 3,000,000 was delayed indefinitely due to several issues in post-production. After six years, Baiskoafu re-launched the project on its first anniversary. The first episode of the series was streamed on 14 November 2019. A total of thirteen episodes were released, where the series finale was streamed on 14 February 2020.

Soundtrack

References

External links
 

Serial drama television series
Maldivian television shows
Maldivian web series